Henry John Cockayne-Cust, JP, DL (10 October 1861 – 2 March 1917) was an English politician and editor who served as a Member of Parliament (MP) for the Unionist Party.

Origins
He was a son of Henry Cockayne-Cust, a younger grandson of Brownlow Cust, 1st Baron Brownlow, of Belton House near Grantham in Lincolnshire, by his wife Sara Jane Cookson.

Career
He was educated at Eton College, where he was captain of the Oppidans, and at Trinity College, Cambridge, where he was elected to the Apostles and from which he graduated with second-class honours in the Classical Tripos with a Bachelor of Arts. Initially pursuing a legal career, Cust was admitted to the Inner Temple in 1888 but was not called to the bar. Instead he decided to enter Parliament, and won a by-election in 1890 for Stamford, Lincolnshire, where the Cust family had been prominent landowners and politicians for many generations. He left Parliament at the general election of 1895, but returned five years later in 1900 when he won a seat in the constituency of Bermondsey in Surrey, remaining until 1906. Meanwhile, he served as Justice of the Peace for Bedfordshire and as Deputy Lieutenant of Bedfordshire, as well as Justice of the Peace for Lincolnshire.

Cust was one of The Souls and was attached to Pamela Wyndham, who later married Edward Tennant, 1st Baron Glenconner. Others in the same clique were Margot Asquith, Arthur Balfour, George Curzon, 1st Marquess Curzon, Alfred Lyttelton, Godfrey Webb, and George Wyndham. Considered a brilliant conversationalist by his contemporaries, he had a reputation as a womaniser and was the natural father of the socialite and philanthropist Lady Diana Cooper, by his mistress the Duchess of Rutland, although this was not acknowledged until much later. Cust was also rumoured to be a natural grandfather of prime minister Margaret Thatcher, through his supposed illegitimate begetting of her mother Beatrice Ethel Stephenson (born  1889), who on 28 May 1917 at the Wesleyan Chapel in Grantham (firmly within the orbit of Belton House), married Alfred Roberts, a shop-keeper in that town, the father of the prime minister. Although there was no solid proof of this connection, Lady Diana Cooper often jokingly referred to Mrs Thatcher as her niece.

In 1892 Cust met William Waldorf Astor, who invited him to edit the Pall Mall Gazette. Despite lacking any background in journalism, Cust immediately accepted. He soon transformed the newspaper into the best evening journal of the period, thanks in part to his securing contributors including Rudyard Kipling and H. G. Wells. Yet Cust rejected contributions submitted by Astor himself, who had literary aspirations; and this, coupled with political disagreements, led to Cust's dismissal in February 1896.

After leaving the Pall Mall Gazette, Cust continued his career as an author. He wrote several poems, most notably "Non nobis".

During World War I Cust was active in propaganda on behalf of the British Government. In August 1914 he founded the Central Committee for National Patriotic Organizations.

Death
He died in 1917 of a heart attack at his home in Hyde Park Gate, London. As the most senior male relative of his childless second cousin Adelbert Brownlow-Cust, 3rd Earl Brownlow, 3rd Viscount Alford, 4th Baron Brownlow, 7th Baronet (1844–1921), he had been the heir apparent to the barony of Brownlow, the Cust baronetcy and to the extensive Cust estates centred on Belton House. However, having predeceased the 3rd Earl by three years, the inheritance fell to his surviving younger brother Adelbert Cockayne-Cust, 5th Baron Brownlow, 8th Baronet (1867–1927).

Marriage

As the result of a purported pregnancy, he married on 11 October 1893 Emmeline Mary Elizabeth Welby-Gregory (1867 – 29 September 1955), known as Nina, a daughter of Sir William Welby-Gregory, 4th Baronet by his wife Victoria Stuart-Wortley. The pregnancy was either false or a misrepresentation, and the couple, whose marriage was thereafter contentious, did not have any children. Nina Cust was an artist and a translator and editor of her mother's papers. She and her husband are buried together at St Peter and St Paul's Church, Belton in an elaborate white marble monument with a recumbent effigy of Harry Cust, sculpted by her.

Illegitimate descendants

Lady Diana Cooper
His best-known lovechild was the socialite Lady Diana Cooper (1892-1986), legally the daughter of Henry Manners, 8th Duke of Rutland. Internationally famous for her beauty, she married the politician Duff Cooper in 1919.

Lady Thatcher (rumoured)
A long-standing rumour has held that Cust had an affair with a servant at Belton House called Phoebe Stephenson, who consequently gave birth to a daughter named Beatrice, who having married Alfred Roberts, a grocer in nearby Grantham, became the mother of  Margaret Thatcher, Prime Minister of the United Kingdom. In the 1980s, the very elderly Diana Cooper referred to Thatcher as "my niece, the Prime Minister".

Others
Anita Leslie, in her book Marlborough House Set, implies that Cust had many more children by aristocratic mistresses:
So much of the Cust strain entered England's peerage that from such a number of cradles there gazed babies with eyes like large sapphires instead of the black boot buttons of their legal fathers.

Legacy
 An annual Cust Lecture "on some important current topic relating to the British Empire" was endowed in the University of Nottingham to commemorate his work.
 His Occasional Poems appeared in 1918, printed in Jerusalem.

Footnotes

Further reading
 Anita Leslie, The Marlborough House Set, Doubleday, New York, 1973 - Contains an entire chapter on Cust (Chapter 23, pp. 241–248)

External links 

 
 
 

1861 births
1917 deaths
People educated at Eton College
Politics of the London Borough of Southwark
Conservative Party (UK) MPs for English constituencies
UK MPs 1886–1892
UK MPs 1892–1895
UK MPs 1900–1906
Deputy Lieutenants of Bedfordshire
English newspaper editors
English male journalists
British newspaper editors
English male poets